{{Infobox television
| genre              = Reality television
| creator            = Dave Broom(original U.S. series)
| developer          = FremantleMedia Portugal
| presenter          = Bárbara Guimarães
| starring           = Rui BarrosConceição GonçalvesTeresa BrancoNuno Queiroz Ribeiro"O Comando"
| country            = Portugal
| language           = Portuguese
| num_episodes       = 72 + finale
| list_episodes      =
| executive_producer = Ana Torres
| producer           = Nuno Martins
| location           = Alcácer do Sal, Portugal
| runtime            = 60 minutes (approx.)
| channel            = SIC
| first_aired        = 
| last_aired         = 
| preceded_by        = Peso Pesado 1 (2011)
| followed_by        = 
| related            = The Biggest Loser (U.S.) 
}}Peso Pesado 2 was the second season of the SIC entertainment show Peso Pesado (English: Heavy Weight), the Portuguese version of the original American reality television series The Biggest Loser''. It premiered on 2 October 2011 and concluded after 13 weeks of emission (72 daily episodes) with the grand finale, on 31 December 2011. Unlike the debut season, the contestants entered the show as individual participants, not as couples.

This season's host was television presenter Bárbara Guimarães, who replaced Júlia Pinheiro. Returning from the first season were personal trainer Rui Barros, nutritionist Teresa Branco,  and the Commando. Season one trainer Sara Freitas was replaced by fitness instructor Conceição Gonçalves, while Nuno Queiroz Ribeiro was introduced as the show's healthy cuisine chef.

Contestants

Weigh-Ins 
Key

Results 
The contestants are listed in reverse chronological order of elimination:

Weigh-In Difference History

Weigh-In Percentage History

Elimination Voting History 
Key

Footnotes

References 

Portuguese reality television series

pt:Peso Pesado#2ª Edição